HD 108063 is a star that lies approximately 176 light-years away in the constellation of Centaurus. The star is not particularly noteworthy with exception to its enormously high heavy element content.

Properties
     
     
HD 108063 is a somewhat bright star that lies in an area of the southern sky towards the middle of Centaurus. It has not been studied particularly extensively, but was identified as modestly high proper motion star during the previous century. With a Hipparcos parallax of 18.5 mas, it lies at a distance of 54 parsecs, so the star is fairly nearby. The relative brightness of the star at its distance means that it is substantially over-luminous compared to a dwarf star, and as of such it has been previously classified as a G5III or G4IV star. On the Hertzsprung-Russell diagram (left), the star lies on the subgiant branch, confirming that it is over-luminous. The star's B-V colour indicates a spectral type of F9.5, while the spectroscopic effective temperature indicates a spectral type closer to F9.

Determination of the metallicity of HD 108063 has only been made more recently, with the first value made photometrically in 2004. Their Fe/H of 0.66 dex is slightly higher than the spectroscopic value of Fe/H = 0.55 ± 0.06 dex, which corresponds to a metallicity of 3.54  times the solar value. This is one of the highest metallicities for any known star, and is identical to 1σ to the Fe/H of HD 126614 (0.56 ± 0.04 dex) and HD 177830 (0.55 ± 0.03 dex).

The enormous metallicity of HD 108063 has strong effect on its apparent parameters. A metal-rich star has a cooler surface temperature than a lower-metallicity star, with the strength of the effect increasing with a higher metallicity. On a plot of B-V (which is an indicator of temperature) to absolute magnitude for main sequence stars (left), HD 108063 has the absolute magnitude of an F0V star but the B-V of an F9-G0V (F9.5V) star, again showing that the star is significantly above the main sequence. However, on a plot of stellar mass to absolute magnitude (left), HD 108063 has parameters consistent with an F0V star. This indicates that the over-luminosity is actually an overly low temperature caused by the star's metallicity and that the apparent subgiant luminosity is artificial. HD 108063 is therefore likely to be on the main sequence.

Notes

References

Durchmusterung objects
108063
060591
4721
Centaurus (constellation)
F-type subgiants